Riccardo Foppa (born 13 April 1961) is a former Italian World Cup alpine ski racer.

World Championships results

National titles
Foppa has won a national title.
Italian Alpine Ski Championships
Giant slalom: 1981

References

External links
 

1961 births
Living people
Italian male alpine skiers